Saxifragales is an order of 15 families of flowering plants. It belongs to the superrosids, a group of around 150 related families, including the rose family. The order includes fruit-bearing shrubs, woody vines, succulents, aquatics, and many ornamental trees and garden plants, including stonecrops, currants and witch-hazels.

Peonies are bred by horticulturists and widely cultivated in temperate gardens. The antiseptic resin of sweetgum trees has been used as a balm since biblical times. Cercidiphyllum japonicum, the largest tree species native to Japan, is used to make boards for the game of Go. Redcurrants, rich in pectin, are used in jams and juices.

Glossary
From the glossary of botanical terms:
annual: a plant that completes its life cycle (i.e. germinates, reproduces, and dies) within a single year or growing season
deciduous: shedding or falling seasonally, as with bark, leaves, or petals
herbaceous: not woody; usually green and soft in texture
perennial: not an annual or biennial
succulent (adjective): juicy or fleshy
unisexual: of one sex; bearing only male or only female reproductive organs

Although the Saxifragales families are quite diverse, there are a few visible traits that can be linked to many of them. The plants have relatively small seeds, except in the family Peridiscaceae. Flowers tend to have separate, unfused petals, without nectar-secreting glands. The pollen-bearing anthers are often attached by their bases. Most fruits are follicles (seed pods). There are often two distinct ovaries, each with a hypanthium, a tube or cup-like structure in a flower that includes the bases of sepals, petals, and stamens.

Families

See also

Notes

Citations

References
 
  See the licence.
 
 
 
 
 
 
  See their terms-of-use license.
 
 
 
 
 

Systematic
Taxonomic lists (families)
Gardening lists
Lists of plants